OSAX or OSax may refer to:

 Old Saxon language
 Apple Script Open Scripting Architecture extensions